In Greek mythology, Myton (Ancient Greek: Μύτωνος Mýtonos) was the son of Poseidon and Mytilene, daughter of King Macareus of Lesbos or of Pelops, king of Pisa in Elis. He was also considered as the eponym of the city Mytilene.

Note

References 

 Stephanus of Byzantium, Stephani Byzantii Ethnicorum quae supersunt, edited by August Meineike (1790–1870), published 1849. A few entries from this important ancient handbook of place names have been translated by Brady Kiesling. Online version at the Topos Text Project.

Children of Poseidon
Demigods in classical mythology